Grossheim or  Großheim is a German-language surname. Notable people with the surname include:

Alexander Alfonsovich Grossheim, Russian botanist
Karl von Großheim, German architect and President of the Prussian Academy of Arts
Oscar Grossheim,  American photographer

German-language surnames